The Kill Team may refer to:

The Kill Team (2013 film), a documentary about the murders of at least three Afghan civilians perpetrated by a group of U.S. Army soldiers in 2010, during the War in Afghanistan
The Kill Team (2019 film), a docudrama based on the above real-life events

See also
Maywand District murders, the event on which the films are based